XHEMU-FM/XELRDA-AM is a radio station on 103.7 FM and 580 AM in Piedras Negras, Coahuila. It is owned by Claudio Mario Bres Medina and is known as La Rancherita del Aire.

History
XHEMU began as XEMU-AM 580. The original concession was awarded on March 10, 1937 to Alfonso Bres Burckhardt. Upon his death, the station was transferred to its current owner.

It moved to FM in 2011 and was cleared to change transmitter sites in 2015.

In the IFT-4 radio auction of 2017, La Rancherita del Aire bought back its former AM frequency of 580, which now has the callsign XELRDA-AM.

References

Radio stations in Coahuila
Radio stations established in 1937